Tradition Is a Temple is an American documentary film about New Orleans jazz culture and modernization's effect on American traditions, written and directed by Darren Hoffman and released in 2013.

Synopsis
Contemporary New Orleans jazz musicians discuss their childhood introductions to music in Baptist churches and through local traditions such as the second line (parades) and jazz funerals, and the role of Danny Barker (1909–1994) in keeping traditional New Orleans Jazz alive through the 1970s and '80s. Asking the artists point-blank, director Darren Hoffman explores the potential "death" of traditional jazz through modernization and marginalization, and its preservation through mentorship and the continuation of traditions that intrigue and inspire young people to play the music of previous generations.

Performances and production
In addition to in depth personal interviews, Tradition is a Temple is composed of various multi-camera professional studio recordings. The performances were recorded by steve Reynolds at the University of New Orleans School of Music. The production took place completely post-Hurricane Katrina, beginning in August 2006.

References

External links
 
 

2013 films
American documentary films
Dixieland
Documentary films about African Americans
Documentary films about jazz music and musicians
Documentary films about New Orleans
2010s English-language films
2010s American films